Ronald or Ron Maxwell may refer to:

Ronald F. Maxwell (born 1949), American film director
Ron Maxwell (trade unionist) (1908–1982), Australian trade unionist and communist
Ronald Douglas Maxwell (1919–1941), British soldier